Daniel Mark Buechlein, OSB (April 20, 1938 – January 25, 2018) was a Benedictine monk and an American prelate of the Roman Catholic Church. He served as the third bishop of the Diocese of Memphis in Tennessee from 1987 until he was appointed the fifth archbishop of the Archdiocese of Indianapolis in Indiana from July 14, 1992. Pope Benedict XVI accepted his early resignation because of health problems on September 21, 2011. He died in 2018.

Biography

Early life 
Daniel Buechlein was born on April 20, 1938, in Jasper, Indiana, to Carl and Rose (née Blessinger) Buechlein, and made his solemn profession as a Benedictine monk on August 15, 1963. 

Buechlein was ordained to the priesthood on May 3, 1964, at St. Meinrad Archabbey in Ferdinand, Indiana. After his ordination, he spent two years studying in Rome.  Returning to Indiana, he became a teacher at the Saint Meinrad School of Theology in Saint Meinrad, Indiana.  In August 1971, he was named president-rector of the Saint Meinrad School of Theology.  Buechlein was appointed president-rector of Saint Meinrad College in 1982.

Bishop of Memphis 
On January 20, 1987, Pope John Paul II appointed Buechlein as the third bishop of the Diocese of MemphisI. He received his episcopal consecration on March 2, 1987, from Archbishop Thomas Kelly, with Archbishops James Stafford and Edward O'Meara serving as co-consecrators.

Archbishop of Indianapolis 
Pope John Paul II appointed Buechlein as the fifth archbishop of the Archdiocese of  Indianapolis on July 14, 1992; he was installed by Archbishop Agostino Cacciavillan on September 9, 1992.  In 1995, Buechlein was appointed co-moderator of the Disciples of Christ-Roman Catholic International Dialogue and as a consultor to the Congregation for the Clergy in the Roman Curia in 2003. Buechlein wrote a weekly column entitled Seeking the Face of the Lord for the official archdiocesan newspaper.

In 2001, Buechlein spoke out against the upcoming execution of Timothy J. McVeigh, a domestic terrorist who murdered 168 people in the 1995 bombing of the Alfred P. Murrah Federal Building in Oklahoma City. Buechlein said that capital punishment only served to feed the cycle of violence.

In the US Conference of Catholic Bishops (USCCB), Buechlein served as chair of the Ad Hoc Committee to Oversee the Use of the Catechism. He worked closely with the publishers of Catholic textbooks to incorporate correct teaching of the Catholic catechism.In 2004, Buechlein established the Bishop Simon Bruté College Seminary on the campus of Marian University in Indianapolis.   The Buechlein Dining Hall is named after him.

On January 18, 2008, Buechlein was diagnosed with Hodgkin's lymphoma,  having experienced heavy fatigue and a swelling under his right arm and then undergoing medical tests on the previous January 13. He had expected that although his ministry would be slightly curtailed that the archdiocese will continue to operate as usual.  On June 20, 2008, Buechlein announced that his cancer was in remission and his regular routine would resume in August. In 2009, he had a shoulder replacement and in 2010, he had surgery to remove a benign tumor from his stomach.  In March 2011, Buechlein suffered a small stroke and was admitted to St. Vincent Hospital in Indianapolis.

Retirement and legacy 
On September 21, 2011, Pope Benedict XVI accepted Buechlein's resignation as archbishop of Indianapolis for health reasons. Buechlein announced his plan to retire to the St. Meinrad Archabbey. In October 2012, Pope Benedict XVI named Archbishop Joseph Tobin as his successor; he was installed on December 3, 2012, in the Cathedral.

Daniel M. Buechlein died on January 25, 2018, at the St. Meinrad Archabbey infirmary at age 79.

References

External links 
Archdiocese of Indianapolis – About Archbishop Buechlein
Archdiocese of Indianapolis – Bishops and Archbishops of the Archdiocese

1938 births
2018 deaths
20th-century Roman Catholic archbishops in the United States
21st-century Roman Catholic archbishops in the United States
American Benedictines
Roman Catholic archbishops of Indianapolis
Benedictine bishops
People from Jasper, Indiana
Roman Catholic Diocese of Memphis
Religious leaders from Tennessee
Catholics from Indiana